Eupheme was the ancient Greek female spirit of words of good omen, praise, acclaims, shouts of triumph, and applause. Her opposite was Momus and her sisters were Euthenia, Eucleia, and Philophrosyne. Along with her sisters, she was regarded as a member of the younger Charites. According to the Orphic fragments, Eupheme's parents were Hephaestus and Aglaea.

References 

Personifications in Greek mythology
Greek goddesses
Children of Hephaestus